Brian Moore McCracken (born 13 July 1934) is a retired Irish judge who served as a Judge of the Supreme Court from 2002 to 2006 and a Judge of the High Court from 1995 to 2002. He is an officer of Trinity College, Dublin – Visitor of the College.

Education and career
McCracken was born in Cork in 1934. He was educated at The High School, Dublin, and later at University of Dublin and King's Inns Dublin. He became a barrister in 1957 and a senior counsel in 1975. McCracken was appointed a High Court judge in 1995 and was elevated to Ireland's Supreme Court in 2002. His in-depth expertise in the field of intellectual property law was widely recognised but he also had expertise in both chancery and commercial law.

McCracken Tribunal

Judge McCracken was appointed as the sole member of the McCracken Tribunal which was set up by the Bruton Government in February 1997 to investigate reports of secret payments by Ben Dunne Jnr. to former Taoiseach Charles Haughey and former cabinet Minister Michael Lowry and others.

The Tribunal heard evidence in July 1997 and produced a 100-page report the following month. This report found that Haughey had given untrue evidence under oath and that Lowry was knowingly assisted by Dunne in evading tax. As a result of the findings and revelation of substantial funds in secret Ansbacher accounts, owned by Haughey, the new Ahern Government established a more extensive follow-up, the Moriarty Tribunal to investigate the financial affairs of the two politicians.

Charles Haughey faced criminal charges for obstructing the work of the McCracken tribunal. His trial on these charges was postponed indefinitely after the judge in the case found that he would not be able to get a fair trial following prejudicial comments by Tánaiste Mary Harney.

Compared to the succeeding, and other tribunals, the McCracken Tribunal was praised for its efficiency in concluding within months.

He retired from the Supreme Court on 12 July 2006.

See also
Public inquiries in Ireland
Tribunal
Public Inquiry
Beef Tribunal
Moriarty Tribunal
Mahon Tribunal

External links 
 Report of the McCracken Tribunal

References

1934 births
Living people
20th-century Irish lawyers
People from County Cork
Irish barristers
Judges of the Supreme Court of Ireland
Politics of the Republic of Ireland
People educated at The High School, Dublin
Alumni of Trinity College Dublin
High Court judges (Ireland)
Alumni of King's Inns